Bab Menara is one of the gates of the medina of Tunis.

It was situated to the west of the former enclosure, it takes the name Bab Menara "Gate of the Fanal", during the reign of the Hafsides (reign of 1228 to 1574), when an oil lamp or lamp is installed to To illuminate the road of the caravans. She is also nicknamed "Porte de la Folle".

References

Menara